Toubon may refer to:

Jacques Toubon (born 1941), French politician
Toubon Law, relating to the use of the French language